The National Association for Interpretation is a non-profit professional association of natural and cultural resources interpreters, primarily in the United States. It is based in Fort Collins, Colorado.

NAI provides training and certification programs and is recognized as a major source for professional expertise and training in the field. The NAI publishes the Journal of Interpretation Research, a peer-reviewed academic journal. An annual conference and workshop provides professional development, collaboration and networking opportunities.

NAI was formed in 1988, when the Association of Interpretive Naturalists (founded 1954) and the Western Interpreters Association (founded 1965) merged into a unified organization.

See also 
 Association for Heritage Interpretation

References

External links 
 National Association for Interpretation - home page
 Definitions Project

Organizations established in 1954
Cultural heritage of the United States
Museum organizations
Environmental education
Heritage interpretation organizations
1988 establishments in the United States